Adolfo Vítor Casais Monteiro (Porto, Portugal, 4 July 1908 - São Paulo, Brasil, 23 July 1972) was a Portuguese essayist, poet and writer.

Biography 
Casais Monteiro graduated in History and Philosophy at University of Porto (Faculdade de Letras), where he was colleague of Agostinho da Silva and Delfim Santos, in 1933. At Porto he started as a high school teacher at Liceu Rodrigues de Freitas, until he was prevented from teaching by the government dictatorship in 1937. He would eventually go into exile in Brasil in 1954 for the same reasons.

After the removal of Miguel Torga, Branquinho da Fonseca and Edmundo de Bettencourt, in 1930, Adolfo Casais Monteiro was director of the Coimbra's literary journal Presença (journal), with José Régio and João Gaspar Simões. This journal published the  political views of Casais Monteiro until it ceased publication in 1940. He was arrested several times due to his political opinions adverse to the Estado Novo regime and directed anonymously the weekly Mundo Literário in 1936 e 1937.

Prevented from teaching, Casais Monteiro goes to Lisbon, living as literary author, translator and editor. As Agostinho da Silva or Jorge de Sena, he would eventually leave to Brasil, due to his opposition to Estado Novo, which he could not accept. He also directed the journal Princípio (1930) and collaborated with the journals Sudoeste (1935) and Variante (1942–43).

Having participated in the celebrations of the 4th centenary of Cidade de São Paulo, in 1954, Adolfo Casais Monteiro fixed residence in Brasil, teaching since then Portuguese Literature in several Brazilian universities, namely at Universidade da Bahia in Salvador, till fixed in 1962 at Universidade Estadual Paulista (UNESP), Campus de Araraquara-SP. He wrote by then several essays and wrote as literary critic for several Brazilian newspapers, having contributed to the study of Fernando Pessoa and the Movimento da Presença.

Among his translation works is Germania, de Tacitus, published in 1941. His only novel, Adolescentes (Teenagers), was published in 1945.

His poetic work, which began in 1929 with "Confusão", was influenced by the first Portuguese modernism, approaching stylistically the aestheticism of André Gide. Their criticisms of concreteness were based on the idea that this aesthetic movement promoted impersonality, starting from the "'purest abstractions to build a  new language to the service of nothing, a pure language, an invention of objects - in short: a beautiful toy". "While some authors describe it as independent of Surrealism others emphasize the influence that this had on the author's current aesthetic, as can be seen in his essays on authors such as Jules Supervielle, Henri Michaux and Antonin Artaud (designating the latter as  unsustainable presence ). Much of his poetry is dedicated to the specific historical period in which he lived, as in the poem "Europa", de 1945, which was read by his friend and colleague António Pedro in  Literary World  at the microphones of London BBC.

Married Mary Alice Pereira Gomes, also a writer and sister of Soeiro Pereira Gomes, with whom he had a son.

Works

Poetry 
 Confusão - 1929
 Correspondência de Família (with Ribeiro Couto) - 1933
 Poemas do Tempo Incerto - 1934
 Sempre e Sem Fim - 1937
 Versos (comprises the 3 previous books) - 1944
 Canto da Nossa Agonia - 1942
 Noite Aberta aos Quatro Ventos - 1943
 Europa - 1946
 Simples Canções da Terra - 1949
 Voo sem Pássaro Dentro - 1954
 Poesias Escolhidas - 1960
 Poesias Completas - 1969

Novel 
 Adolescentes - 1945

Translation 
 A Educação Sentimental - Gustave Flaubert - Reedited by Editora Nova Alexandria, 2009.

Essay 
 Considerações Pessoais - 1935
 A Poesia de Ribeiro Couto - 1935
 A Poesia de Jules Supervielle - 1938
 Sobre o Romance Contemporâneo - 1940
 De Pés Fincados na Terra - 1941
 Manuel Bandeira - 1944
 O Romance e os seus Problemas - 1950
 Fernando Pessoa e a Crítica - 1952
 Fernando Pessoa, o Insincero Verídico - 1954
 Problemas da Crítica de Arte (A Crítica e a Arte Moderna) - 1956
 Estudos sobre a Poesia de Fernando Pessoa - 1958
 A Poesia da Presença (with un anthology) - 1959
 Clareza e Mistério da Crítica - 1961
 O Romance (Teoria e Crítica) - 1964
 A Palavra Essential - 1965
 A Literatura Popular em Verso no Brasil - 1965
 Estrutura e Autenticidade como Problemas da Teoria e da Crítica Literárias - 1968
 O País do Absurdo - 1974
 O que foi e o que não foi o Movimento da «Presença» - 1995
 Melancolia do Progresso - 2003

Epistolography 
 Cartas Inéditas de António Nobre (Introduction and notes from ACM) - 1933
 Cartas em Família - 2008
 Cartas a Sua Mãe - 2008

References

External links 

 Adolfo Casais Monteiro, Antigo Estudante da Faculdade de Letras da Universidade do Porto
 CANTINHO, Maria João - Adolfo Casais Monteiro: o estrangeiro definitivo
 Adolfo Casais Monteiro: uma outra presença - mostra bibliográfica na Biblioteca Nacional, Lisboa, sem data
 Adolfo Casais Monteiro - Direcção-Geral do Livro e das Bibliotecas

1908 births
1972 deaths
Modernist poets
People from Porto
Portuguese essayists
20th-century Portuguese poets
Portuguese male poets
University of Porto alumni
Male essayists
20th-century essayists
20th-century male writers